Ronggui Sub-district is a sub-district in Shunde, Foshan, Guangdong, China. It sits at the southeast of Shunde and a part of Shunde City Zone. It was formed by the merging of Rongqi Town and Guizhou Town. It has a resident population of 460,000 within its area of 80 square kilometers.

It is one of the largest production bases of electric appliances in China. Appliance manufacturers, such as Rongsheng, Hisense Kelon, Wanjiale, Galanz and Wanhe, are headquartered in Ronggui.

History
Rongqi and Guizhou were initially separate towns, both administrated by Shunde district. After Feb. 2, 2000, the towns were abolished and Ronggui subdistrict was established.

In 1452, Shunde was founded as a county and Rongqi and Guizhou were villages belonging to Shunde County.

In 1928, Rongqi Village became Rongqi Town but Guizhou remained a village and was administrated by Rongqi.

In 1959, both Rongqi and Guizhou were changed into people's communes.

In 1983, the people's commune was rescinded and Rongqi and Guizhou became towns.

In 2000, Rongqi town and Guizhou town were rescinded and Ronggui subdistrict was established.

Administration
Twenty-three neighborhood committees and three village committees make up Ronggui Subdistrict.

Economy

Since Chinese economic reform began in 1978, the people of Shunde were given control over their situation. This has allowed Ronggui, once a traditional agricultural county, to gradually develop into a modern industrial town. By 2012, the Ronggui GDP had reached 38.66 billion yuan. Its industrial and commercial tax revenue reached 5.186 billion and the balance of savings deposits of Ronggui's residents had reached 29.035 billion. Many industrial companies were founded in Ronggui, such as Rongsheng, Hisense Kelon, Wanjiale, Galanz and Wanhe.

Ronggui is home to the Charming Innovation Center (CIC). CIC boasts modern business and leisure facilities based in the Xingfucun community.

Architecture

Shusheng bridge 

Shusheng bridge is located in the Rongli Committee of Ronggui. It was built in the 18th century. It is made of the root of a banyan beside the river. It was said the quondam bridge was broken frequently. In order to rectify this issue, the villagers drew the root of that banyan across the river and stuck it in the opposite bank. Over time, the root grew bigger and bigger. Once it was large enough, the villagers added planks atop the root and the bridge was built. This bridge remains in use.

Guizhou Wenta (Wen Tower)

The Guizhou Wenta was built in 1794 CE. It was as tall as 42 meters with 7 floors. The tower is shaped as a hexagon. In the twenty-first century, the tower stood alone in the wilderness. In 2007 the government repaired the Guizhou Wenta again and put up many communal facilities around the tower, including a library, swimming pool and basketball court. Guizhou Wenta had become an attractive destination.

References

External links

Official site of Ronggui Government 

Shunde District
Township-level divisions of Guangdong